Philip Reilly (born January 11, 1952) is an American fencer. He competed in the team sabre event at the 1984 Summer Olympics.

A resident of Bloomfield, New Jersey, Reilly attended Essex Catholic High School.

References

External links
 

1952 births
Living people
American male sabre fencers
Olympic fencers of the United States
Fencers at the 1984 Summer Olympics
Essex Catholic High School alumni
People from Bloomfield, New Jersey
Fencers from Portland, Oregon
Sportspeople from Newark, New Jersey
Pan American Games medalists in fencing
Pan American Games silver medalists for the United States
Fencers at the 1979 Pan American Games
Fencers at the 1983 Pan American Games